Cosmotomidius setosus is a species of beetle in the family Cerambycidae. It was described by Audinet-Serville in 1835. It is known from Paraguay, Argentina and Brazil.

References

Pogonocherini
Beetles described in 1835